Christopher Ameyaw Akumfi is the member of parliament for the constituency. He was elected on the ticket of the New Patriotic Party (NPP) and won a majority of 2,139 votes to become the MP. He succeeded Alex Kyeremeh who had also represented the constituency in the 4th Republic parliament on the ticket of the National Democratic Congress (NDC)..

See also
List of Ghana Parliament constituencies

References 

Parliamentary constituencies in the Bono East Region